Dichelia numidicola is a species of moth of the family Tortricidae. It is found in Algeria.

The larvae feed on Abies numidica.

References

Moths described in 1990
Archipini